Laurent Di Lorto (1 January 1909 – 28 October 1989) was a French footballer who played goalkeeper.

International career
He was France's goalkeeper at 1938 FIFA World Cup. Di Lorto was the first person of Italian descent to represent the France national football team.

References

External links
FFF Profile

1909 births
1989 deaths
People from Martigues
French footballers
France international footballers
Olympique de Marseille players
FC Sochaux-Montbéliard players
Ligue 1 players
1938 FIFA World Cup players
Association football goalkeepers
French people of Italian descent
Sportspeople from Bouches-du-Rhône
Footballers from Provence-Alpes-Côte d'Azur